Preciosa, a Spanish and Portuguese word meaning precious or beautiful, may refer to:

Radio
 La Preciosa 92.3 FM (KSJO), San Jose, Californias
 La Preciosa 101.5 FM (KIZS), Tulsa Metro Area, Oklahoma
 La Preciosa AM 800 (KBFP) Bakersfield, California

Location
 Preciosa, a baranguay (political sub-division) in Sara, a municipality located in the province of Iloilo, the Philippines
 Preciosa Platanares Wildlife Refuge, a protected sub-division of the Osa Conservation Area, in Costa Rica

Other uses
 Preciosa (corporation), a luxury brand name lead crystal glass company
 Preciosa, an 1821 play by Pius Alexander Wolff, with incidental music by Carl Maria von Weber
"Preciosa" (song), a 1937 song composed by Rafael Hernández Marín, covered by many artists
 Preciosa, the verrin hawk in Marion Zimmer Bradley's Hawkmistress!, a novel in the Darkover series
 Preciosa (film), a 1965 film set in Puerto Rico
 "Preciosa", nickname for late pop singer Selena
 Preciosa (telenovela), a 1998 Mexican telenovela

See also
 Precious (disambiguation)